Curtis or Curt Lyons may refer to:

Curtis Lyons, character in The Lyons
Curtis Lyons (actor), as Curtis in Only You (The Americans)
Curt Lyons, baseball player